Life was an American magazine published weekly from 1883 to 1972, as an intermittent "special" until 1978, and as a monthly from 1978 until 2000. During its golden age from 1936 to 1972, Life was a wide-ranging weekly general-interest magazine known for the quality of its photography, and was one of the most popular magazines in the nation, regularly reaching one-quarter of the population.

Life was independently published for its first 53 years until 1936 as a general-interest and light entertainment magazine, heavy on illustrations, jokes, and social commentary. It featured some of the most notable writers, editors, illustrators and cartoonists of its time: Charles Dana Gibson, Norman Rockwell and Jacob Hartman Jr. Gibson became the editor and owner of the magazine after John Ames Mitchell died in 1918. During its later years, the magazine offered brief capsule reviews (similar to those in The New Yorker) of plays and movies currently running in New York City, but with the innovative touch of a colored typographic bullet resembling a traffic light, appended to each review: green for a positive review, red for a negative one, and amber for mixed notices.

In 1936, Time publisher Henry Luce bought Life, only wanting its title: he greatly re-made the publication. Life (now stylized in all caps) became the first all-photographic American news magazine, and it dominated the market for several decades, with a circulation of more than 13.5 million copies a week at one point. Possibly the best-known image published in the magazine was Alfred Eisenstaedt's photograph of a nurse in a sailor's arms, taken on August 14, 1945 during a VJ-Day celebration in New York's Times Square. The magazine's role in the history of photojournalism is considered its most important contribution to publishing. Its profile was such that the memoirs of President Harry S. Truman, Prime Minister Winston Churchill, and General Douglas MacArthur were all serialized in its pages.

After 2000, Time Inc. continued to use the Life brand for special and commemorative issues. Life returned to regularly scheduled issues when it became a weekly newspaper supplement from 2004 to 2007. The website life.com, originally one of the channels on Time Inc.'s Pathfinder service, was for a time in the late 2000s managed as a joint venture with Getty Images under the name See Your World, LLC. On January 30, 2012, the Life.com URL became a photo channel on Time.com.

1883 humor and general interest magazine

Life was founded on January 4, 1883, in a New York City artist's studio at 1155 Broadway, as a partnership between John Ames Mitchell and Andrew Miller. Mitchell held a 75% interest in the magazine with the remaining 25% held by Miller. Both men retained their holdings until their deaths. Miller served as secretary-treasurer of the magazine and managed the business side of the operation. Mitchell, a 37-year-old illustrator who used a $10,000 inheritance to invest in the weekly magazine, served as its publisher. He also created the first Life name-plate with cupids as mascots and later on, drew its masthead of a knight leveling his lance at the posterior of a fleeing devil. Then he took advantage of a new printing process using zinc-coated plates, which improved the reproduction of his illustrations and artwork. This edge helped because Life faced stiff competition from the best-selling humor magazines Judge and Puck, which were already established and successful. Edward Sandford Martin was brought on as Lifes first literary editor; the recent Harvard University graduate was a founder of the Harvard Lampoon.

The motto of the first issue of Life was: "While there's Life, there's hope." The new magazine set forth its principles and policies to its readers:

We wish to have some fun in this paper...We shall try to domesticate as much as possible of the casual cheerfulness that is drifting about in an unfriendly world...We shall have something to say about religion, about politics, fashion, society, literature, the stage, the stock exchange, and the police station, and we will speak out what is in our mind as fairly, as truthfully, and as decently as we know how.

The magazine was a success and soon attracted the industry's leading contributors, of which the most important was Charles Dana Gibson. Three years after the magazine was founded, the Massachusetts native first sold Life a drawing for $4: a dog outside his kennel howling at the moon. Encouraged by a publisher, also an artist, Gibson was joined in Life early days by illustrators such as Palmer Cox (creator of the Brownie), A. B. Frost, Oliver Herford and E. W. Kemble. Lifes literary roster included the following: John Kendrick Bangs, James Whitcomb Riley and Brander Matthews.

Mitchell was accused of anti-Semitism at a time of high rates of immigration to New York of eastern European Jews. When the magazine blamed the theatrical team of Klaw & Erlanger for Chicago's Iroquois Theater Fire in 1903, many people complained. Life drama critic, James Stetson Metcalfe, was barred from the 47 Manhattan theatres controlled by the Theatrical Syndicate. Life published caricatures of Jews with large noses.

Several individuals would publish their first major works in Life. In 1908 Robert Ripley published his first cartoon in Life, 20 years before his Believe It or Not! fame. Norman Rockwell's first cover for Life magazine, Tain't You, was published May 10, 1917. His paintings were featured on Life cover 28 times between 1917 and 1924. Rea Irvin, the first art director of The New Yorker and creator of the character "Eustace Tilley", began his career by drawing covers for Life.

This version of Life took sides in politics and international affairs, and published pro-American editorials. After Germany attacked Belgium in 1914, Mitchell and Gibson undertook a campaign to push the U.S. into the war. Gibson drew the Kaiser as a bloody madman, insulting Uncle Sam, sneering at crippled soldiers, and shooting Red Cross nurses.

Following Mitchell's death in 1918, Gibson bought the magazine for $1 million, but the end of World War I had brought on social change. Life brand of humor was outdated, as readers wanted more daring and risque works, and Life struggled to compete. A little more than three years after purchasing Life, Gibson quit and turned the decaying property over to publisher Clair Maxwell and treasurer Henry Richter. Gibson retired to Maine to paint and lost interest in the magazine.

In 1920, Gibson selected former Vanity Fair staffer Robert E. Sherwood as editor. A WWI veteran and member of the Algonquin Round Table, Sherwood tried to inject sophisticated humor onto the pages. Life published Ivy League jokes, cartoons, flapper sayings and all-burlesque issues. Beginning in 1920, Life undertook a crusade against Prohibition. It also tapped the humorous writings of Frank Sullivan, Robert Benchley, Dorothy Parker, Franklin Pierce Adams and Corey Ford. Among the illustrators and cartoonists were Ralph Barton, Percy Crosby, Don Herold, Ellison Hoover, H. T. Webster, Art Young and John Held, Jr.

Life had 250,000 readers in 1920, but as the Jazz Age rolled into the Great Depression, the magazine lost money and subscribers. By the time Maxwell and editor George Eggleston took over, Life had switched from publishing weekly to monthly. The two men went to work revamping its editorial style to meet the times, which resulted in improved readership. However, Life had passed its prime and was sliding toward financial ruin. The New Yorker, debuting in February 1925, copied many of the features and styles of Life; it recruited staff from its editorial and art departments. Another blow to Life circulation came from raunchy humor periodicals such as Ballyhoo and Hooey, which ran what can be termed "outhouse" gags. In 1933, Esquire joined Life competitors. In its final years, Life struggled to make a profit.

Announcing the end of Life, Maxwell stated: "We cannot claim, like Mr. Gene Tunney, that we resigned our championship undefeated in our prime. But at least we hope to retire gracefully from a world still friendly."

For Life final issue in its original format, 80-year-old Edward Sandford Martin was recalled from editorial retirement to compose its obituary. He wrote:

That Life should be passing into the hands of new owners and directors is of the liveliest interest to the sole survivor of the little group that saw it born in January 1883 ... As for me, I wish it all good fortune; grace, mercy and peace and usefulness to a distracted world that does not know which way to turn nor what will happen to it next. A wonderful time for a new voice to make a noise that needs to be heard!

1936 weekly news magazine

In 1936, publisher Henry Luce paid $92,000 (worth $ in ) to the owners of Life magazine because he sought the name for his company, Time Inc. Time Inc. sold Life subscription list, features, and goodwill to Judge. Convinced that pictures could tell a story instead of just illustrating text, Luce launched the new Life on November 23, 1936, along with John Shaw Billings and  Daniel Longwell as founding editors. The third magazine published by Luce, after Time in 1923 and Fortune in 1930, Life developed as the definitive photo magazine in the U.S., giving as much space and importance to images as to words. The first issue of Life, which sold for ten cents (worth $ in ), featured five pages of Alfred Eisenstaedt's photographs.

In planning the weekly news magazine, Luce circulated a confidential prospectus, within Time Inc. in 1936, which described his vision for the new Life magazine, and what he viewed as its unique purpose. Life magazine was to be the first publication, with a focus on photographs, that enabled the American public,

To see life; to see the world; to eyewitness great events; to watch the faces of the poor and the gestures of the proud; to see strange things — machines, armies, multitudes, shadows in the jungle and on the moon; to see man’s work — his paintings, towers and discoveries; to see things thousands of miles away, things hidden behind walls and within rooms, things dangerous to come to; the women that men love and many children; to see and take pleasure in seeing; to see and be amazed; to see and be instructed...
—Prospectus for a New MagazineLife in 2012: The Year in 12 Galleries. Retrieved September 24, 2015

Luce's first issue cover depicted the Fort Peck Dam in Montana, a Works Progress Administration project, photographed by Margaret Bourke-White.

The format of Life in 1936 was a success: the text was condensed into captions for 50 pages of photographs. The magazine was printed on heavily coated paper and cost readers only a dime. The magazine's circulation was beyond the company's predictions, going from 380,000 copies of the first issue to more than one million a week four months later. It soon challenged The Saturday Evening Post, then the largest-circulation weekly in the country.  The magazine's success stimulated many imitators, such as Look, which was founded a year later in 1937 and ran until 1971.

Luce moved Life into its own building at 19 West 31st Street, a Beaux-Arts building constructed in 1894. Later Life moved its editorial offices to 9 Rockefeller Plaza.

Success
A co-founder of the new Life magazine, Longwell served as managing editor from 1944 to 1946 and chairman of the board of editors until his retirement in 1954. He was credited for publishing Winston Churchill's The Second World War and Ernest Hemingway's The Old Man and the Sea.

Luce also selected Edward Kramer Thompson, a stringer for Time, as assistant picture editor in 1937. From 1949 to 1961 he was the managing editor, and served as editor-in-chief for nearly a decade, until his retirement in 1970. His influence was significant during the magazine's heyday, which was roughly from 1936 until the mid-1960s. Thompson was known for the free rein he gave his editors, particularly a "trio of formidable and colorful women: Sally Kirkland, fashion editor; Mary Letherbee, movie editor; and Mary Hamman, modern living editor."

When the U.S. entered the war in 1941, so did Life. By 1944, of the 40 Time and Life war correspondents, seven were women: Americans Mary Welsh Hemingway, Margaret Bourke-White, Lael Tucker, Peggy Durdin, Shelley Smith Mydans, Annalee Jacoby, and Jacqueline Saix, an Englishwoman. (Saix's name is often omitted from the list, but she and Welsh are the only women listed as part of the magazine's team in a Times publisher's letter, dated May 8, 1944.)

Life backed the war effort each week. In July 1942, Life launched its first art contest for soldiers and drew more than 1,500 entries, submitted by all ranks. Judges sorted out the best and awarded $1,000 in prizes. Life picked 16 for reproduction in the magazine. The National Gallery in Washington, D.C. agreed to put 117 entries on exhibition that summer. Life, also supported the military's efforts to use artists to document the war. When Congress forbade the armed forces from using government money to fund artists in the field, Life privatized the programs, hiring many of the artists being let go by the Department of War (which would later become the Department of Defense). On December 7, 1960, Life managers later donated many of the works by such artists to the Department of War and its art programs, such as the United States Army Art Program.

Each week during World War II, the magazine brought photographs of the war to Americans; it had photographers from all theaters of war. The magazine was imitated in enemy propaganda using contrasting images of Life and Death.

In August 1942, writing about labor and racial unrest in Detroit, Life warned that "the morale situation is perhaps the worst in the U.S. ... It is time for the rest of the country to sit up and take notice. For Detroit can either blow up Hitler or it can blow up the U.S." Mayor Edward Jeffries was outraged: "I'll match Detroit's patriotism against any other city's in the country. The whole story in Life is scurrilous ... I'd just call it a yellow magazine and let it go at that." The article was considered so dangerous to the war effort that it was censored from copies of the magazine sold outside North America.

The magazine hired war photographer Robert Capa. A veteran of Collier's magazine, Capa accompanied the first wave of the D-Day invasion in Normandy, France, on June 6, 1944, and returned with only a handful of images, many of them out of focus. The magazine wrote in the captions that the photos were fuzzy because Capa's hands were shaking. He denied it, claiming that the darkroom had ruined his negatives. Later he poked fun at Life by titling his war memoir Slightly Out of Focus (1947). In 1954, Capa was killed after stepping on a landmine, while working for the magazine covering the First Indochina War. Life photographer Bob Landry also went in with the first wave at D-Day, "but all of Landry's film was lost, and his shoes to boot."

In a notable mistake, in its final edition just before the 1948 U.S. presidential election, the magazine printed a large photo showing U.S. presidential candidate Thomas E. Dewey and his staff riding across San Francisco, California harbor entitled "Our Next President Rides by Ferryboat over San Francisco Bay". Incumbent President Harry S. Truman won the election. Dewey was expected to win the election, and this mistake was also made by the Chicago Tribune.

On May 10, 1950, the council of ministers in Cairo banned Life from Egypt forever. All issues on sale were confiscated. No reason was given, but Egyptian officials expressed indignation over the April 10, 1950 story about King Farouk of Egypt, entitled the "Problem King of Egypt". The government considered it insulting to the country.

Life in the 1950s earned a measure of respect by commissioning work from top authors. After Life publication in 1952 of Ernest Hemingway's The Old Man and the Sea, the magazine contracted with the author for a 4,000-word piece on bullfighting. Hemingway sent the editors a 10,000-word article, following his last visit to Spain in 1959 to cover a series of contests between two top matadors. The article was republished in 1985 as the novella, The Dangerous Summer.

In February 1953, just a few weeks after leaving office, President Harry S. Truman announced that Life magazine would handle all rights to his memoirs. Truman said it was his belief that by 1954 he would be able to speak more fully on subjects pertaining to the role his administration played in world affairs. Truman observed that Life editors had presented other memoirs with great dignity; he added that Life also made the best offer.

For his 1955 Museum of Modern Art traveling exhibition The Family of Man, which was to be seen by nine million visitors worldwide, curator Edward Steichen relied heavily on photographs from Life; 111 of the 503 pictures shown, constituting more than 20% as counted by Abigail Solomon-Godeau. His assistant Wayne Miller entered the magazine's archive in late 1953 and spent an estimated nine months there. He searched through 3.5 million images, most in the form of original negatives (only in the last years of the war did the picture department start to print contact sheets of all assignments) and submitted to Steichen for selection, many that had not been published in the magazine.

In November 1954, the actress Dorothy Dandridge was the first African-American woman to be featured on the cover of the magazine.

In 1957, R. Gordon Wasson, a vice president at J. P. Morgan, published an article in Life extolling the virtues of magic mushrooms. This prompted Albert Hofmann to isolate psilocybin in 1958 for distribution by Sandoz alongside LSD in the U.S., further raising interest in LSD in the mass media. Following Wasson's report, Timothy Leary visited Mexico to try out the mushrooms, which were used in traditional religious rituals.

Lifes motto became "To see Life; to see the world." The magazine produced many popular science serials, such as The World We Live In and The Epic of Man in the early 1950s. The magazine continued to showcase the work of notable illustrators, such as Alton S. Tobey, whose contributions included the cover for a 1958 series of articles on the history of the Russian Revolution.

However, as the 1950s drew to a close and television became more popular, the magazine was losing readers. In May 1959 it announced plans to reduce its regular news-stand price from 25 cents a copy to 20. With the increase in television sales and viewership, interest in news magazines was waning. Life had to try to create a new form.

1960s and the end of an era

 

In the 1960s, the magazine was filled with color photos of movie stars, President John F. Kennedy and his family, the war in Vietnam, and the Apollo program. Typical of the magazine's editorial focus was a long 1964 feature on actress Elizabeth Taylor and her relationship with actor Richard Burton. Journalist Richard Meryman traveled with Taylor to New York, California, and Paris. Life ran a 6,000-word first-person article on the screen star.

"I'm not a 'sex queen' or a 'sex symbol,' " Taylor said. "I don't think I want to be one. Sex symbol kind of suggests bathrooms in hotels or something. I do know I'm a movie star and I like being a woman, and I think sex is absolutely gorgeous. But as far as a sex goddess, I don't worry myself that way... Richard is a very sexy man. He's got that sort of jungle essence that one can sense... When we look at each other, it's like our eyes have fingers and they grab ahold.... I think I ended up being the scarlet woman because of my rather puritanical upbringing and beliefs. I couldn't just have a romance. It had to be a marriage."

In the 1960s, the magazine featured photographs by Gordon Parks. "The camera is my weapon against the things I dislike about the universe and how I show the beautiful things about the universe," Parks recalled in 2000. "I didn't care about Life magazine. I cared about the people," he said.

The June 1964 Paul Welch Life article entitled "Homosexuality In America" was the first time a national publication reported on gay issues. Life's photographer was referred to the gay leather bar in San Francisco called the Tool Box for the article by Hal Call, who had long worked to dispel the myth that all homosexual men were effeminate. The article opened with a two-page spread of the mural of life-size leathermen in the bar, which had been painted by Chuck Arnett in 1962. The article described San Francisco as "The Gay Capital of America" and inspired many gay leathermen to move there.

On March 25, 1966, Life featured the drug LSD as its cover story.  The drug had attracted attention among the counter culture and was not yet criminalized.

In March 1967, Life won the 1967 National Magazine Award, chosen by the Columbia University Graduate School of Journalism.

Despite the industry's accolades and its coverage of the U.S. mission to the Moon in 1969, the magazine continued to lose circulation. Time Inc. announced in January 1971 its decision to reduce circulation from 8.5 million to 7 million, in an effort to offset shrinking advertising revenues. The following year, Life cut its circulation further, to 5.5 million beginning with the January 14, 1972 issue. Life was reportedly not losing money, but its costs were rising faster than its profits. Life lost credibility with many readers when it supported author Clifford Irving, whose fraudulent autobiography of Howard Hughes was revealed as a hoax in January 1972. The magazine had purchased serialization rights to Irving's manuscript.

Industry figures showed that some 96% of Life'''s circulation went to mail subscribers, with only 4% coming from the more profitable newsstand sales. Gary Valk was publisher when on December 8, 1972, the magazine announced it would cease publication by the end of the year and lay off hundreds of staff. The weekly Life magazine published its last issue on December 29, 1972.

From 1972 to 1978, Time Inc. published ten Life Special Reports on such themes as "The Spirit of Israel", "Remarkable American Women" and "The Year in Pictures". With a minimum of promotion, these issues sold between 500,000 and 1 million copies at cover prices of up to $2.

1978 monthly (1978–2000)
Beginning with an October 1978 issue, Life was published as a monthly, with a new, modified logo. Although it remained a familiar red rectangle with the white type, the new version was larger, the lettering was closer together and the box surrounding it was smaller.Life continued for the next 22 years as a moderately successful general-interest, news features magazine. In 1986, it decided to mark its 50th anniversary under the Time Inc. umbrella with a special issue showing every Life cover starting from 1936, which included the issues published during the six-year hiatus in the 1970s. The circulation in this era hovered around the 1.5 million-circulation mark. The cover price in 1986 was $2.50. The publisher at the time was Charles Whittingham; the editor was Philip Kunhardt. In 1991 Life sent correspondents to the first Gulf War and published special issues of coverage. Four issues of this weekly, Life in Time of War, were published during the first Gulf War.

The magazine struggled financially and, in February 1993, Life announced the magazine would be printed on smaller pages starting with its July issue. This issue also featured the return of the original Life logo.Life reduced advertising prices by 34% in a bid to make the monthly publication more appealing to advertisers. The magazine reduced its circulation guarantee for advertisers by 12% in July 1993 to 1.5 million copies from the current 1.7 million. The publishers in this era were Nora McAniff and Edward McCarrick, while Daniel Okrent was the editor. Life for the first time was the same trim size as its longtime Time Inc. sister publication, Fortune.

Though experiencing financial trouble, in 1999 the magazine still made news by compiling lists to round out the 20th century. Life editors ranked their "Most Important Events of the Millennium." This list has been criticized for being overly focused on Western achievements. The Chinese, for example, had invented type four centuries before Johannes Gutenberg, but with thousands of ideograms, found its use impractical. Life also published a list of the "100 Most Important People of the Millennium." This list, too, was criticized for focusing on the West. Thomas Edison's number one ranking was challenged since critics believed other inventions, such as the Internal combustion engine, the automobile, and electricity-making machines, for example, had greater effects on society than Edison's. The top 100 list was criticized for mixing world-famous names, such as Isaac Newton, Albert Einstein, Louis Pasteur, and Leonardo da Vinci, with figures largely unknown outside of the United States (18 Americans compared to 13 Italian and French, and 11 English).

In March 2000, Time Inc. announced it would cease regular publication of Life with the May issue.

"It's a sad day for us here," Don Logan, chairman and chief executive of Time Inc., told CNN.com. "It was still in the black," he said, noting that Life was increasingly spending more to maintain its monthly circulation level of approximately 1.5 million. "Life was a general interest magazine and since its reincarnation, it had always struggled to find its identity, to find its position in the marketplace," Logan said.

The magazine's last issue featured a human interest story. In 1936, its first issue under Henry Luce featured a baby named George Story, with the headline "Life Begins"; over the years the magazine had published updates about the course of Story's life as he married, had children, and pursued a career as a journalist. After Time announced its pending closure in March, George Story happened to die of heart failure on April 4, 2000. The last issue of Life was titled "A Life Ends", featuring his story and how it had intertwined with the magazine over the years.

For Life subscribers, remaining subscriptions were honored with other Time Inc. magazines, such as Time. In January 2001, these subscribers received a special, Life-sized format of "The Year in Pictures" edition of Time magazine. It was a Life issue disguised under a Time logo on the front. (Newsstand copies of this edition were published under the Life imprint.)

While citing poor advertising sales and a difficult climate for selling magazine subscriptions, Time Inc. executives said a key reason for closing the title in 2000 was to divert resources to the company's other magazine launches that year, such as Real Simple. Later that year, its parent company, Time Warner, struck a deal with the Tribune Company for Times Mirror magazines, which included Golf, Ski, Skiing, Field & Stream, and Yachting. AOL and Time Warner announced a $184 billion merger, the largest corporate merger in history, which was finalized in January 2001.

In 2001, Time Warner began publishing special newsstand "megazine" issues of Life, on topics such as the September 11 attacks in 2001 and the Holy Land. These issues, which were printed on thicker paper, were more like softcover books than magazines.

1990s online presenceLifes online presence began in the 1990s as part of the Pathfinder.com network. The standalone Life.com site was launched on March 31, 2009, and closed on January 30, 2012. Life.com was developed by Andrew Blau and Bill Shapiro, the same team who launched the weekly newspaper supplement. While the archive of Life, known as the Life Picture Collection, was substantial, they searched for a partner who could provide significant contemporary photography. They approached Getty Images, the world's largest licensor of photography. The site, a joint venture between Getty Images and Life magazine, offered millions of photographs from their combined collections. On the 50th anniversary of the night Marilyn Monroe sang "Happy Birthday" to John F. Kennedy, Life.com presented Bill Ray's iconic portrait of the actress, along with other rare photos.

2013 movie release
The film, The Secret Life of Walter Mitty (2013), starring Ben Stiller and Kristen Wiig, portrays Life as it transitioned from printed material toward having only an online presence. Life.com later became a redirect to a small photo channel on Time.com. Life.com also maintains Tumblr and Twitter accounts and a presence on Instagram.

 2004 supplement (2004–2007)
Beginning in October 2004, Life was revived for a second time. It resumed weekly publication as a free supplement to U.S. newspapers, competing for the first time with the two industry heavyweights, Parade and USA Weekend. At its launch, it was distributed with more than 60 newspapers with a combined circulation of approximately 12 million. Among the newspapers to carry Life were the Washington Post, New York Daily News, Los Angeles Times, Chicago Tribune, Denver Post, and St. Louis Post-Dispatch. Time Inc. made deals with several major newspaper publishers to carry the Life supplement, including Knight Ridder and the McClatchy Company. The launch of Life as a weekly newspaper supplement was conceived by Andrew Blau, who served as the President of Life. Bill Shapiro was the founding editor of the weekly supplement.

This version of Life retained its trademark logo but sported a new cover motto, "America's Weekend Magazine." It measured 9½ x 11½ inches and was printed on glossy paper in full color. On September 15, 2006, Life was 19 pages of editorial content. The editorial content contained one full-page photo, of actress Julia Louis-Dreyfus, and one three-page, seven-photo essay, of Kaiju Big Battel. On March 24, 2007, Time Inc. announced that it would fold the magazine as of April 20, 2007, although it would keep the web site.

2008: Google partnership
On November 18, 2008, Google began hosting an archive of the magazine's photographs, as part of a joint effort with Life. Many images in this archive had never been published in the magazine. The archive of over six million photographs from Life is also available through Google Cultural Institute, allowing for users to create collections, and is accessible through Google image search. The full archive of the issues of the main run (1936–1972) is available through Google Book Search.

2016 and later: special issues
Special editions of Life are published on notable occasions, such as a Bob Dylan edition on the occasion of his winning the Nobel Prize in Literature, in 2016, Paul at 75, in 2017, and "Life" Explores:  The Roaring '20s in 2020. Life is now published by the IAC's subsidiary Dotdash Meredith.

TodayLife is currently owned by Dotdash Meredith, which own most of former Time Inc. and Meredith Corporation assets.

Contributors
Notable contributors have included:

 John Kendrick Bangs (editor, writer)
 Dominic Behan (writer)

Photojournalists:

 Harry Benson
 Berry Berenson
 Walter Bosshard 
 Margaret Bourke-White
 Brian Brake 
 Larry Burrows 
 David Burnett
 David Douglas Duncan
 Robert Capa
 Henri Cartier-Bresson
 Loomis Dean 
 John Dominis
 Alfred Eisenstaedt 
 Eliot Elisofon
 Bill Eppridge 
 Andreas Feininger 
 Ron Galella 
 Alfred Gescheidt 
 Bob Gomel 
 Allan Grant 
 Dirck Halstead
 Marie Hansen
 Bernard Hoffman
 Henri Huet 
 Isaac Kitrosser
 Peter B. Martin
 Hansel Mieth 
 Lee Miller 
 Gjon Mili 
 Ralph Morse 
 Carl Mydans 
 Gordon Parks
 John Phillips
 Bill Ray
 Co Rentmeester
 Paul Schutzer
 Art Shay
 George Silk
 George Strock
 W. Eugene Smith 
 Peter Stackpole
 Pete Souza
 Edward K. Thompson (M. editor 1949–61; editor 1961–70)
 John Vachon
 Jeff Vespa (and editor)
 Leigh Wiener 
 Tony Zappone (Europe edition)
 John G. Zimmerman 
 Lalaine Madrigal

Film critics:

 Brad Darrach 
 Wheeler Winston Dixon

Fashion:

 Howell Conant (fashion photographer)
 Sally Kirkland (editor/fashion)
 Clay Felker (sportswriter, founder of New York magazine)

Photographers:

 John Florea 
 Henry Grossman
 Philippe Halsman
 Dorothea Lange
 Nina Leen
 Mark Shaw
 André Weinfeld (portrait)
 Edward Steichen (portrait)

Illustrators:

 Charles Dana Gibson
 Lejaren Hiller, Sr.
 Mary Hamman (modern living editor)
 Jane Howard (journalist correspondent)
 Will Lang Jr. (bureau chief)
 Henry Luce (publisher, editor-in-chief)
 Richard Edes Harrison (cartographer)
 Gerald Moore (reporter)

Writers:

 Normand Poirier
 Ronald B. Scott
 Thomas Thompson (and editor)
 David Snell (journalist/writer/cartoonist)

See also
 List of defunct American periodicals

References

Further reading
 
 
 Doss, Erika, ed. (2001). Looking at Life Magazine. Essays by experts.
 
 
 
 
 
 Wainwright, Loudon. The Great American Magazine: An inside history of Life (Random House Inc, 1986). .
  Evolution of photojournalism, centered on the magazine.
 
 
 

External links

 Life.com official site
 Life archives (1883–1936) at HathiTrust Digital Library
 Full Life magazine issues from 1936 through 1972 at Google Books
 "Le magazine Life, la chronique de l'Amérique" at Le Monde Life covers at CoverBrowser
 Magazine Data File: Life (1883)
 Online archive ,  Life'' covers, the humor magazine (1883–1936)

 
Defunct magazines published in the United States
Magazines disestablished in 2007
Magazines established in 1883
Magazines published in New York City
Monthly magazines published in the United States
News magazines published in the United States
Newspaper supplements
Online magazines with defunct print editions
Photojournalistic magazines
Weekly magazines published in the United States
IAC (company)